Franz Fischler (born 23 September 1946) is an Austrian politician from the Christian-conservative People's Party (ÖVP). He was the European Union's Commissioner for Agriculture, Rural Development and Fisheries (1995–2004). He also was President of the European Forum Alpbach.

Education and early career 
Born in Absam, Tyrol Fischler studied agriculture at the University of Natural Resources and Applied Life Sciences Vienna, and finished as Dr rer.nat.oec. in 1978. He worked as University assistant from 1973 to 1979, then for the Tyrol Chamber of Agriculture, finally as its director from 1985 to 1989.

Political career 

Between 1989 and 1994 Fischler was Federal Minister for Agriculture and Forestry, and since 1990 elected Member of National Council. In 1995 he became European Commissioner in Brussels, responsible for agriculture and rural development. In 1999 fisheries also became part of his responsibilities.

At the 1999 Berlin summit, Fischler had significant influence on the Agenda 2000.

In 2011 Austria has decided to nominate Fischler as a candidate for the position of director general of FAO; the position went to José Graziano da Silva instead.

Other activities 
 Trilateral Commission, Member of the European Group.
 Institute for Advanced Studies (IHS), Chair of the Board of Trustees

Further reading 
 
See also:

Notes and references

External links 
 Franz Fischler Consult
 Franz Fischler for Food and Agriculture Organisation (FAO)

1946 births
Living people
Austrian European Commissioners
Agriculture ministers of Austria
University of Natural Resources and Life Sciences, Vienna alumni
Austrian agronomists